J. Robertson was a Scottish footballer who played in The Football League for Accrington. Robertson club and League debut were at inside forward for the visit of Burnley on 1 December 1888. Accrington won 5–1 and Robertson played the next 2 games. Robertson was left out for the trip to Pikes Lane, the then home of Bolton Wanderers. What happened to him after that is not recorded.

References

Scottish footballers
Greenock Morton F.C. players
Accrington F.C. players
English Football League players
Association football inside forwards